Adda is a tributary of the Po in North Italy.

Adda River may also refer to:

 Adda River (South Sudan), a river in Western Bahr el Ghazal, South Sudan
 River Adda (Wales), a small watercourse which flows through the city of Bangor, North Wales

See also
 Adda (disambiguation)
 Ada River (disambiguation)
 Arda River (disambiguation)